The Seteais Palace is a neoclassical palace located in Sintra, on the Portuguese Riviera, operating as a luxury hotel known as the Tivoli Palácio de Seteais Hotel. The palace is a national landmark and is included in the UNESCO Cultural Landscape of Sintra World Heritage Site listing.

Etymology 

Jose Alfredo mentions in “Seteais fields” that this field is very old and has always been an integral part of the precinct behind the palace. Some people believe that its name comes from the tradition of shouting “ai” on the road where its echo is repeated 7 times. On the other hand, a very old manuscript by an anonymous author kept in Sintra library mentions that the origin of the word of Seteais derives from the land named Centeais where rye was being cultivated.

History

The Seteais Palace was built between 1783 and 1787 for the Dutch consul Daniel Gildemeester, on lands granted by the Marquis of Pombal.

Although Daniel Gildemeester had a land in the neighborhood of Quinta da Alegria property, there was not any house to live in. So Gildemeester had lived in the Palace of Marquis of Pombal as a tenant during summer. He started to build his own mansion close to the property (Monserrate Palace) of his friend British consul Gerard de Visme in order to leave the Palace of Marquis of Pombal.

The consul chose to build his house on the border of an elevation, from which the vast landscape around the Sintra hills could be admired. The palace was surrounded with a large garden with fruit trees.

In 1797, some years after the consul's death, his widow sold the palace to Diogo José Vito de Menezes Noronha Coutinho, 5th Marquis of Marialva. The palace was enlarged between 1801 and 1802, probably by neoclassical architect José da Costa e Silva, author of the São Carlos Theatre in Lisbon. The palace was turned into a symmetrical U-shaped building, with the consul's house becoming one of its wings. The cornice of the buildings that compose the main façade was decorated with typical neoclassical motifs like vases, busts and reliefs of garlands. The gardens of the palace were remodelled following romantic trends.

The old and the new wings were connected in 1802 by a neoclassical arch, built in honour of Prince regent John VI and Princess Carlota Joaquina, who visited the palace in that year. The monumental arch, decorated with the bronze effigies of the royal pair and a commemorative Latin inscription, is attributed to architect Francisco Leal Garcia.

The walls of several inner rooms of the palace were decorated with frescos attributed to French painter Jean Pillement and his followers. Painted motifs include exotic vegetation and mythological characters, typical of the neoclassical taste.

After changing hands several times, the palace was acquired by the Portuguese government in 1946. The Seteais Palace has been used as a luxury hotel since 1954 but its original characteristics have been preserved.

See also 
 Palace of Sintra
 Pena Palace
 Palace of Queluz
 Palace of Mafra
 Monserrate Palace

References

External links 

 Tivoli Palácio de Seteais Hotel official site
 Seteais Palace in the IPPAR website
 Seteais Palace in the Sintra Municipality website

Houses completed in 1787
Palaces in Portugal
Buildings and structures in Sintra
Neoclassical palaces
Neoclassical architecture in Portugal
Palaces in Lisbon District
Hotels in Portugal
1787 establishments in Portugal
Hotels established in 1954